Matevž is a Slovene given name. It is a variation of Matthew. Notable people with the name include:

 Matevž Fran Beer, mayor of Ljubljana
 Matevž Frang, mayor of Ljubljana
 Matevž Kamnik (born 1987) Slovene volleyball player
 Matevž Kos (born 1966), Slovene literary historian and essayist
 Matevž Lenarčič, Slovene extreme light aircraft pilot
 Matevž Skok (born 1986), Slovene handball player

Slovene masculine given names